Tuscany is one of the 29 constituencies represented in the Chamber of Deputies, the lower house of the Italian parliament. The constituency currently elects 39 deputies. Its boundaries correspond to those of the Italian region of Tuscany. The electoral system uses a parallel voting system, which act as a mixed system, with 37% of seats allocated using a first-past-the-post electoral system and 61% using a proportional method, with one round of voting. 

The constituency was first established by the Mattarella law on 4 August 1993 and later confirmed by the Calderoli law on 21 December 2005 and by the Rosato law on 3 November 2017.

Members of the Parliament

2018–present

References

Chamber of Deputies constituencies in Italy
1993 establishments in Italy
Constituencies established in 1993
Politics of Italy